The 1970–71 Philadelphia Flyers season was the Philadelphia Flyers' fourth season in the National Hockey League (NHL). The Flyers lost in the quarterfinals to the Chicago Black Hawks in a four-game sweep.

Regular season
Bobby Clarke led the team in goals (27), assists (36), and points (63) in his second season.

Season standings

Playoffs
The Flyers were swept in four games by the Chicago Black Hawks in the first round. Even though the team had improved their record in his second season behind the bench, head coach Vic Stasiuk was replaced by Fred Shero in the off-season.

Schedule and results

Regular season

|- style="background:#cfc;"
| 1 || October 10 || Minnesota North Stars || 2–1 || 1–0–0 || 2 || 
|- style="background:#fcf;"
| 2 || October 11 || Montreal Canadiens || 1–2 || 1–1–0 || 2 || 
|- style="background:#cfc;"
| 3 || October 15 || Vancouver Canucks || 5–4 || 2–1–0 || 4 || 
|- style="background:#ffc;"
| 4 || October 17 || @ Pittsburgh Penguins || 0–0 || 2–1–1 || 5 || 
|- style="background:#cfc;"
| 5 || October 18 || Toronto Maple Leafs || 4–2 || 3–1–1 || 7 || 
|- style="background:#cfc;"
| 6 || October 22 || Buffalo Sabres || 4–2 || 4–1–1 || 9 || 
|- style="background:#fcf;"
| 7 || October 24 || @ Montreal Canadiens || 1–3 || 4–2–1 || 9 || 
|- style="background:#fcf;"
| 8 || October 25 || @ Boston Bruins || 3–4 || 4–3–1 || 9 || 
|- style="background:#cfc;"
| 9 || October 29 || Los Angeles Kings || 3–1 || 5–3–1 || 11 || 
|-

|- style="background:#cfc;"
| 10 || November 1 || Pittsburgh Penguins || 3–2 || 6–3–1 || 13 || 
|- style="background:#fcf;"
| 11 || November 5 || @ Detroit Red Wings || 1–3 || 6–4–1 || 13 || 
|- style="background:#ffc;"
| 12 || November 7 || Chicago Black Hawks || 1–1 || 6–4–2 || 14 || 
|- style="background:#cfc;"
| 13 || November 8 || @ Buffalo Sabres || 3–1 || 7–4–2 || 16 || 
|- style="background:#fcf;"
| 14 || November 11 || @ Chicago Black Hawks || 1–7 || 7–5–2 || 16 || 
|- style="background:#fcf;"
| 15 || November 15 || St. Louis Blues || 1–2 || 7–6–2 || 16 || 
|- style="background:#cfc;"
| 16 || November 19 || California Golden Seals || 6–2 || 8–6–2 || 18 || 
|- style="background:#fcf;"
| 17 || November 21 || Boston Bruins || 2–5 || 8–7–2 || 18 || 
|- style="background:#fcf;"
| 18 || November 22 || Detroit Red Wings || 2–4 || 8–8–2 || 18 || 
|- style="background:#cfc;"
| 19 || November 25 || New York Rangers || 3–1 || 9–8–2 || 20 || 
|- style="background:#fcf;"
| 20 || November 28 || @ Chicago Black Hawks || 1–3 || 9–9–2 || 20 || 
|- style="background:#cfc;"
| 21 || November 29 || Vancouver Canucks || 4–2 || 10–9–2 || 22 || 
|-

|- style="background:#fcf;"
| 22 || December 1 || @ Vancouver Canucks || 4–5 || 10–10–2 || 22 || 
|- style="background:#cfc;"
| 23 || December 4 || @ California Golden Seals || 4–0 || 11–10–2 || 24 || 
|- style="background:#ffc;"
| 24 || December 5 || @ Los Angeles Kings || 4–4 || 11–10–3 || 25 || 
|- style="background:#cfc;"
| 25 || December 9 || @ St. Louis Blues || 5–2 || 12–10–3 || 27 || 
|- style="background:#fcf;"
| 26 || December 10 || @ Detroit Red Wings || 1–3 || 12–11–3 || 27 || 
|- style="background:#fcf;"
| 27 || December 12 || Boston Bruins || 0–1 || 12–12–3 || 27 || 
|- style="background:#ffc;"
| 28 || December 13 || St. Louis Blues || 2–2 || 12–12–4 || 28 || 
|- style="background:#fcf;"
| 29 || December 15 || @ Vancouver Canucks || 2–3 || 12–13–4 || 28 || 
|- style="background:#fcf;"
| 30 || December 18 || @ California Golden Seals || 0–1 || 12–14–4 || 28 || 
|- style="background:#ffc;"
| 31 || December 19 || @ Los Angeles Kings || 2–2 || 12–14–5 || 29 || 
|- style="background:#fcf;"
| 32 || December 26 || @ Toronto Maple Leafs || 1–9 || 12–15–5 || 29 || 
|- style="background:#fcf;"
| 33 || December 27 || Montreal Canadiens || 2–4 || 12–16–5 || 29 || 
|- style="background:#fcf;"
| 34 || December 30 || @ St. Louis Blues || 2–5 || 12–17–5 || 29 || 
|-

|- style="background:#fcf;"
| 35 || January 2 || Chicago Black Hawks || 1–3 || 12–18–5 || 29 || 
|- style="background:#fcf;"
| 36 || January 3 || Boston Bruins || 1–5 || 12–19–5 || 29 || 
|- style="background:#cfc;"
| 37 || January 6 || Pittsburgh Penguins || 4–3 || 13–19–5 || 31 || 
|- style="background:#ffc;"
| 38 || January 7 || Los Angeles Kings || 5–5 || 13–19–6 || 32 || 
|- style="background:#cfc;"
| 39 || January 9 || California Golden Seals || 5–3 || 14–19–6 || 34 || 
|- style="background:#cfc;"
| 40 || January 10 || @ Montreal Canadiens || 3–2 || 15–19–6 || 36 || 
|- style="background:#cfc;"
| 41 || January 14 || Toronto Maple Leafs || 3–0 || 16–19–6 || 38 || 
|- style="background:#cfc;"
| 42 || January 16 || @ Detroit Red Wings || 4–2 || 17–19–6 || 40 || 
|- style="background:#fcf;"
| 43 || January 17 || Los Angeles Kings || 1–4 || 17–20–6 || 40 || 
|- style="background:#ffc;"
| 44 || January 20 || @ New York Rangers || 3–3 || 17–20–7 || 41 || 
|- style="background:#ffc;"
| 45 || January 21 || Montreal Canadiens || 5–5 || 17–20–8 || 42 || 
|- style="background:#ffc;"
| 46 || January 23 || @ Minnesota North Stars || 2–2 || 17–20–9 || 43 || 
|- style="background:#fcf;"
| 47 || January 24 || @ Buffalo Sabres || 4–6 || 17–21–9 || 43 || 
|- style="background:#fcf;"
| 48 || January 28 || @ Boston Bruins || 2–6 || 17–22–9 || 43 || 
|- style="background:#cfc;"
| 49 || January 30 || New York Rangers || 5–2 || 18–22–9 || 45 || 
|- style="background:#cfc;"
| 50 || January 31 || Detroit Red Wings || 3–1 || 19–22–9 || 47 || 
|-

|- style="background:#cfc;"
| 51 || February 4 || Chicago Black Hawks || 6–2 || 20–22–9 || 49 || 
|- style="background:#fcf;"
| 52 || February 6 || @ Toronto Maple Leafs || 2–4 || 20–23–9 || 49 || 
|- style="background:#fcf;"
| 53 || February 7 || St. Louis Blues || 2–6 || 20–24–9 || 49 || 
|- style="background:#fcf;"
| 54 || February 10 || @ Pittsburgh Penguins || 3–5 || 20–25–9 || 49 || 
|- style="background:#ffc;"
| 55 || February 13 || @ Minnesota North Stars || 2–2 || 20–25–10 || 50 || 
|- style="background:#fcf;"
| 56 || February 14 || @ Buffalo Sabres || 2–3 || 20–26–10 || 50 || 
|- style="background:#cfc;"
| 57 || February 17 || @ Los Angeles Kings || 4–0 || 21–26–10 || 52 || 
|- style="background:#cfc;"
| 58 || February 19 || @ Vancouver Canucks || 3–2 || 22–26–10 || 54 || 
|- style="background:#fcf;"
| 59 || February 20 || @ California Golden Seals || 3–5 || 22–27–10 || 54 || 
|- style="background:#fcf;"
| 60 || February 24 || @ New York Rangers || 2–4 || 22–28–10 || 54 || 
|- style="background:#cfc;"
| 61 || February 25 || Buffalo Sabres || 3–2 || 23–28–10 || 56 || 
|- style="background:#cfc;"
| 62 || February 27 || Vancouver Canucks || 8–1 || 24–28–10 || 58 || 
|-

|- style="background:#ffc;"
| 63 || March 4 || Detroit Red Wings || 2–2 || 24–28–11 || 59 || 
|- style="background:#ffc;"
| 64 || March 6 || California Golden Seals || 4–4 || 24–28–12 || 60 || 
|- style="background:#fcf;"
| 65 || March 7 || @ Minnesota North Stars || 1–3 || 24–29–12 || 60 || 
|- style="background:#ffc;"
| 66 || March 10 || @ Pittsburgh Penguins || 2–2 || 24–29–13 || 61 || 
|- style="background:#fcf;"
| 67 || March 12 || @ New York Rangers || 2–7 || 24–30–13 || 61 || 
|- style="background:#cfc;"
| 68 || March 13 || @ Toronto Maple Leafs || 3–2 || 25–30–13 || 63 || 
|- style="background:#cfc;"
| 69 || March 18 || New York Rangers || 2–1 || 26–30–13 || 65 || 
|- style="background:#fcf;"
| 70 || March 20 || @ Boston Bruins || 3–5 || 26–31–13 || 65 || 
|- style="background:#ffc;"
| 71 || March 21 || Toronto Maple Leafs || 1–1 || 26–31–14 || 66 || 
|- style="background:#fcf;"
| 72 || March 24 || @ Montreal Canadiens || 3–5 || 26–32–14 || 66 || 
|- style="background:#ffc;"
| 73 || March 25 || Minnesota North Stars || 2–2 || 26–32–15 || 67 || 
|- style="background:#fcf;"
| 74 || March 27 || @ Chicago Black Hawks || 1–3 || 26–33–15 || 67 || 
|- style="background:#cfc;"
| 75 || March 28 || Pittsburgh Penguins || 3–1 || 27–33–15 || 69 || 
|-

|- style="background:#ffc;"
| 76 || April 1 || @ St. Louis Blues || 1–1 || 27–33–16 || 70 || 
|- style="background:#cfc;"
| 77 || April 3 || Minnesota North Stars || 3–2 || 28–33–16 || 72 || 
|- style="background:#ffc;"
| 78 || April 4 || Buffalo Sabres || 3–3 || 28–33–17 || 73 || 
|-

|-
| Legend:

Playoffs

|- style="background:#fcf;"
| 1 || April 7 || @ Chicago Black Hawks || 2–5 || Black Hawks lead 1–0 || 
|- style="background:#fcf;"
| 2 || April 8 || @ Chicago Black Hawks || 2–6 || Black Hawks lead 2–0 || 
|- style="background:#fcf;"
| 3 || April 10 || Chicago Black Hawks || 2–3 || Black Hawks lead 3–0 || 
|- style="background:#fcf;"
| 4 || April 11 || Chicago Black Hawks || 2–6 || Black Hawks win 4–0|| 
|-

|-
| Legend:

Player statistics

Scoring
 Position abbreviations: C = Center; D = Defense; G = Goaltender; LW = Left Wing; RW = Right Wing
  = Joined team via a transaction (e.g., trade, waivers, signing) during the season. Stats reflect time with the Flyers only.
  = Left team via a transaction (e.g., trade, waivers, release) during the season. Stats reflect time with the Flyers only.

Goaltending
  = Joined team via a transaction (e.g., trade, waivers, signing) during the season. Stats reflect time with the Flyers only.
  = Left team via a transaction (e.g., trade, waivers, release) during the season. Stats reflect time with the Flyers only.

Awards and records

Awards

Records

The Flyers were swept in their first round series with the Chicago Black Hawks, going winless in the playoffs for the second time, which matched the 1968–69 season and was later matched during the 1982–83 and 1983–84 seasons.

Milestones

Transactions
The Flyers were involved in the following transactions from May 11, 1970, the day after the deciding game of the 1970 Stanley Cup Finals, through May 18, 1971, the day of the deciding game of the 1971 Stanley Cup Finals.

Trades

Players acquired

Players lost

Signings

Draft picks

Philadelphia's picks at the 1970 NHL Amateur Draft, which was held at the Queen Elizabeth Hotel in Montreal, Quebec on June 11, 1970. The Flyers were without a first-round draft pick due to having traded it three years previously to the Boston Bruins for Rosaire Paiement. The Bruins used the pick, fourth overall, to select Rick MacLeish, who the Flyers would acquire seven months later in a trade with the Bruins.

Farm teams
The Flyers were affiliated with the Quebec Aces of the AHL, the Flint Generals of the IHL, and the Jersey Devils of the EHL.

Notes

References
General
 
 
 
Specific

Philadelphia
Philadelphia
Philadelphia Flyers seasons
Philad
Philad